Steve Hytner (born September 28, 1959) is an American actor. He is perhaps best known for his role as Kenny Bania on the NBC series Seinfeld.

Hytner is a native of Long Island, New York. He appeared as a regular in The 100 Lives of Black Jack Savage, Hardball, and Working, in several episodes of Roswell, and also in occasional episodes of CSI: Crime Scene Investigation,  Friends, The King of Queens, Two and a Half Men, Dharma & Greg, The X-Files, Lois & Clark: The New Adventures of Superman, That's So Raven, George Lopez, The Bill Engvall Show, The Jeff Foxworthy Show as Craig Lesko, and Mike & Molly. He portrays Ty Parsec in two episodes of The Adventures of Buzz Lightyear of Star Command (2000).

He performed in the Disney Channel Original Series The Suite Life of Zack & Cody as Herman Spatz, in Good Luck Charlie as Marvin the bellman, and in Sonny with a Chance as Murphy the troublesome security guard.  He plays a motivational workshop instructor in the HBO series Hung.

Hytner has appeared in such movies as In the Line of Fire, Forces of Nature, and Eurotrip.

As Joseph the coroner, Hytner is one of two actors (the other being Christopher Walken) to appear in each of the first three films of The Prophecy series.

He appears in the 2006 comedy film Bachelor Party Vegas and reprised his role as Kenny Bania on the fictional Seinfeld reunion table read on Curb Your Enthusiasm in 2009. He was the Camp Superior counselor in the 2012 comedy film Fred 3: Camp Fred, and plays the role of client Roger Bodder in the comedy/thriller film Bad Vegan and the Teleportation Machine.

Partial filmography

References

External links
 Official website
 

Living people
Male actors from New York (state)
American male film actors
American male television actors
People from Valley Stream, New York
Place of birth missing (living people)
Valley Stream Central High School alumni
1959 births